is a Japanese dish of meat, potatoes and onion stewed in sweetened soy sauce and mirin, sometimes with ito konnyaku and vegetables. Nikujaga is an example of yōshoku (Western-influenced Japanese cuisine).  Generally, potatoes make up the bulk of the dish, with meat mostly serving as a source of flavor. It is usually boiled until most of the liquid has been reduced. Thinly sliced beef is the most common meat used, although minced or ground beef is also popular. Pork is often used instead of beef in eastern Japan.

Nikujaga is a common home-cooked winter dish, served with a bowl of white rice and miso soup. It is also sometimes seen in izakayas.

History

Nikujaga was invented by chefs of the Imperial Japanese Navy in the late 19th 
century. 

One story is that in 1895 Tōgō Heihachirō ordered naval cooks to create a version of the beef stews as 
served in the British Royal Navy. Tōgō was stationed in Maizuru, Kyoto, which established this Imperial 
Japanese Navy base as the birthplace of nikujaga. 

The municipal government of Kure, Hiroshima, responded in 1898 with a competing claim that Tōgō commissioned the dish while serving as chief of staff of the Kure naval base.

See also
 Bosnian pot
 Irish stew
 Lancashire hotpot
 List of Japanese soups and stews
 List of soups
 Pichelsteiner
 Pot roast
 Scouse
 Pot-au-feu

Footnotes

References

External links
 Recipe from Topics Online Magazine by a Japanese emigrant

British fusion cuisine
Japanese beef dishes
Japanese fusion cuisine
Japanese pork dishes
Japanese soups and stews
Meat and potatoes dishes
Potato dishes